"Villain of the week" (or, depending on genre, "monster of the week", "freak of the week" or "alien of the week") is an antagonist that only appears in one episode of a multi-episode work of fiction. A villain of the week is commonly seen in British, American, and Japanese genre-based television series. As many shows of this type air episodes weekly at a rate of ten to twenty new episodes per year, there is often a new antagonist in the plot of each week's episode. The main characters usually confront and vanquish these characters, often leaving them never to be seen again as in wordly famous Doctor Who, Supernatural, but also Charmed, Smallville, and Scooby-Doo. Some series alternate between using such antagonists and furthering the series' ongoing plotlines (as in Buffy the Vampire Slayer, Supernatural, Fringe, and The X-Files, where fandom is often divided over preference for one type of episode versus the other), while others use these one-time foes as pawns of the recurring adversaries (as in Kamen Rider, Sailor Moon, Ultra series and as well as in Super Sentai and its American equivalent, Power Rangers). On other occasions, these villains return reformed, becoming invaluable allies or gaining a larger role in the story. The American action drama Burn Notice focuses on short-lived antagonists, but the final portion of every episode is committed to developing a larger story arc. The British Doctor Who spin-off programme Torchwood used this format in its first two series, before switching to a continuous story format.

"Villain of the week" plotlines are attractive to syndicators, as it means that episodes can be rerun in any order and do not need to be aired in sequence as serials with continuing storylines do.

See also
Big Bad
Plot device

References

Sources
 

Week
Television terminology